The western suburbs is the metropolitan area directly west of the Melbourne Central Business District in Melbourne, Victoria, Australia.

Municipalities 
There are six main municipalities (cities, councils, and shires) in the western suburbs. These are:

 City of Brimbank
 City of Hobsons Bay
 City of Maribyrnong
 City of Melton
 City of Moonee Valley
 City of Wyndham

Major suburbs, satellite cities and commercial areas 
The western suburbs of Melbourne boast some of the oldest landmarks and housing in Melbourne, while also introducing new suburbs and a proud multicultural community. Major suburbs are:

City of Brimbank
 Sunshine
 Deer Park
 Albion
 St Albans
 Albanvale
 Kings Park
 Delahey
 Derrimut
 Sydenham
 Taylors Lakes
 Keilor
 Hillside
 Sunshine West

City of Maribyrnong
 Maribyrnong
 Braybrook
 Footscray
 Yarraville
 Tottenham
 Seddon
 Kingsville
 West Footscray
 Maidstone

City of Melton
 Burnside
 Burnside Heights
 Brookfield
 Kurunjang
 Melton
 Taylors Hill
 Hillside
 Caroline Springs
 Thornhill Park
 Cobblebank
 Weir Views
 Strathtulloh

City of Moonee Valley
Aberfeldie
Airport West
Ascot Vale
Avondale Heights
Essendon
Flemington
Keilor East
Moonee Ponds
Niddrie
Strathmore

City of Wyndham
 Truganina
 Laverton
 Manor Lakes
 Point Cook
 Hoppers Crossing
 Werribee
 Tarneit
 Wyndham Vale
 Williams Landing
 Werribee South

Road Setup
The western suburbs have relied for years on the transportation directly from famous long stretches of road that have now been connected to large freeways for easy access to Melbourne's CBD and neighbouring suburbs.

Major roads are:

 Anderson Road
 Ballarat Road
 Derrimut Road
 Heaths Road
 M80 Ring Road (formally as Western Ring Road)
 Melton Highway (C754)
 Sayers Road
 Station Road

References

 West
Melbourne-related lists
Lists of suburbs in Australia